Rachanā (Sanskrit: रचना) is derived from the root verb – रच् - meaning – to arrange.  Rachanā (रचनम् - ना = रचना) means – arrangement, preparation, disposition, formation, creation, production, performance, completion, array of troops, literary work, a creation of the mind, contrivance, invention e.g.  chitra-rachana  (drawing/painting),  kāvya-rachana  (poetic composition), anvaya-rachana (indeclinable/undistributable middle sentence construction).

Proponents of Advaita Vedanta use this term to refer to the composition or structure of Brahman; Shankara explains that Brahman cannot be described by any name or form, the mind cannot think about Its composition (rachanā). Even Badarayana in his Brahma Sutras (Sutra II.ii.1) states :-

रचनाऽनुपपत्तेश्च नानुमानम् |

"The inferred one (pradhana) is not (the cause) owing to the impossibility of explaining the design, as also for other reasons."

Badarayana uses the word rachanā to mean - 'design', he explains that on no account can the insentient pradhana create this universe, which cannot even be mentally conceived of by the intelligent (skilful persons, architects).

Notable people
 Rachana Narayanankutty: Rachana Narayanankutty is an Actress and television anchor from Kerala, India. She became popular through the television series ‘Marimayam’.
Rachana Banerjee: Rachna Banerjee is an Indian Bengali actress in Calcutta-based Bengali Cinema at Tollywood. She also worked in some South Indian films.
Rachana Maurya: Rachana Maurya (born July 21, 1987) is an Indian dancer and film actress, who has appeared in music videos and performed item numbers in various Indian language films.
Rachana jalindra: The Banded Royal, Rachana jalindra is a species of lycaenid or blue butterfly found in Asia.
Rachana (film): Rachana is a 1983 Indian Malayalam film, directed by Mohan and produced by Sivan Kunnampilly. The film stars Srividya, Nedumudi Venu, Bharath Gopi and Mammootty in lead roles.
Rachana Malayalam: Rachna Malayalam is considered as the first computer operating system in Malayalam language and the first such system in a regional language in India.

Rachana (butterfly): Rachana is a genus of butterflies in the family Lycaenidae.

References

Vedanta
Sanskrit words and phrases
Hindu philosophical concepts